The 1999 Pep Boys Indy Racing League was highly competitive and parity was the order of the year. Team Menard had a very good season with their driver Greg Ray capturing 3 race wins and the series championship. This was the last year before CART teams began to break ranks and jump to the IRL.

Confirmed entries

Season Summary

Schedule

Race results 
All races running on Oval/Speedway.

Race summaries

TransWorld Diversified Services Indy 200
The TransWorld Diversified Services Indy 200 was held on January 24 at Walt Disney World Speedway. Scott Sharp qualified on the pole position. The race was broadcast on ABC.

Top 10 results
 51- Eddie Cheever
 4- Scott Goodyear
 35- Jeff Ward
 8- Scott Sharp
 30- Raul Boesel
 28- Mark Dismore
 18- Steve Knapp
 9- Davey Hamilton
 11- Billy Boat
 91- Buddy Lazier
Failed to qualify: 6-Eliseo Salazar

MCI WorldCom 200
The MCI WorldCom 200 was held on March 28 at Phoenix International Raceway. Greg Ray qualified on the pole position. The race was broadcast on Fox Sports Net.

Top ten results
 4- Scott Goodyear
 21- Jeff Ward
 44- Robbie Buhl
 11- Billy Boat
 66- Scott Harrington
 33- Roberto Moreno
 28- Mark Dismore
 8- Scott Sharp
 99- Sam Schmidt
 7- Stéphan Grégoire
Goodyear's first IndyCar win since the 1994 Marlboro 500 at Michigan International Speedway and his first in IRL competition.
Prior to this race, Ward left ISM Racing to drive for Pagan Racing.

VisionAire 500K
The VisionAire 500K was on held May 1 at Lowe's Motor Speedway.  Greg Ray qualified on the pole position. The race was broadcast on Speedvision.

Top 10 on lap 79: 2- Greg Ray
 4- Scott Goodyear
 51- Eddie Cheever
 99- Sam Schmidt
 98- Donnie Beechler
 8- Scott Sharp
 91- Buddy Lazier
 28- Mark Dismore
 55- Robby McGehee
 14- Kenny Bräck
Failed to qualify: 35-Steve Knapp
On lap 62, Stan Wattles crashed after suffering a suspension failure. John Paul Jr. made contact with, sending Wattles' right rear wheel and tire assembly into the seating area. Scott Harrington also spun in the incident.
The race continued under caution with Lazier initially leading until he had to make a pit stop to replace a punctured tire, giving Ray the lead. On lap 79, the race was stopped so medical helicopters could land.
The race was stopped permanently by track general manager Humpy Wheeler when it was announced that three spectators were killed. As a result, fans and participants were offered refunds.
The race was scratched from the record books due to the fact it did not reach the official race distance of 105 laps (the halfway point plus one lap, unlike the FIA Code, which is simply making it to the start of the fourth lap).
Due to this race and a similar incident (where three people were killed) at the CART 1998 U.S. 500 at Michigan International Speedway, wheel tethers were added to open wheel cars.
This would be the final IndyCar race at Charlotte.

Indianapolis 500
The Indianapolis 500 was held on May 30 at Indianapolis Motor Speedway. Arie Luyendyk qualified on the pole position.Top 10 results 14- Kenny Bräck
 21- Jeff Ward
 11- Billy Boat
 32- Robby Gordon
 55- Robby McGehee
 84- Robbie Buhl
 91- Buddy Lazier
 81- Robby Unser
 22- Tony Stewart
 54- Hideshi Matsuda
Failed to qualify: 7-Stéphan Grégoire, 10-John Paul Jr., 10-Andy Michner, 15-Jaques Lazier, 15-Troy Reiger, 18-Mike Borkowski, 18-Ronnie Johncox, 19-Stan Wattles, 31, 34-Nick Firestone, 34-Jim Guthrie, 36-Brian Tyler, 36-Vincenzo Sospiri, 43-Dave Steele, 46-Mike Groff, 66-Scott Harrington and 90-Lyn St. James
Until 2006, this race had the latest pass for the lead in Indianapolis 500 history when Gordon pitted on lap 199 and Bräck took the lead in turn 4.
Combined, Arie Luyendyk and Greg Ray led 95 laps. Luyendyk crashed while attempting to lap Tyce Carlson on lap 118 and during the ensuing caution, Ray was hit by Mark Dismore while exiting his pit stall.
The day before the race, the Motorola 300 at Gateway International Raceway for the FedEx CART Championship Series was held. Gordon and Roberto Moreno competed in the race (Gordon competed full-time in CART and did Indianapolis as a one-off for Team Menard, due Menards being his sponsor in the series, and Moreno was hired as an injury replacement at PacWest Racing for Mark Blundell while concurrently driving for Truscelli Racing in the IRL). Moreno finished 4th and Gordon 27th due to a crash.
Stewart, who moved to the NASCAR Winston Cup Series, did Double Duty by competing at Indianapolis and the Coca-Cola 600 at Lowe's Motor Speedway. He finished 9th at Indianapolis, four laps down, and 4th at Charlotte on the lead lap, despite being moved to the rear of the field due to missing a drivers’ meeting.
Rookie of the Year McGehee had an incident during a pit stop where a pit crew member hit the ground, but survived.
This race was planned on being Luyendyk's final race. However, he returned to race part-time from 2001 to 2003.
Four drivers named either Robby or Robbie finished in the top 10.

Longhorn 500
The Longhorn 500 was held on June 12 at Texas Motor Speedway. Mark Dismore qualified on the pole position. The race was broadcast on Fox Sports Net.Top 10 results 4- Scott Goodyear
 2- Greg Ray
 99- Sam Schmidt
 7- Stéphan Grégoire
 6- Eliseo Salazar
 81- Robby Unser
 9- Davey Hamilton
 28- Mark Dismore
 12- Buzz Calkins
 8- Scott Sharp
Failed to qualify: 19-Stan Wattles and 50-Roberto Guerrero
Ray entered the race 20th in points and left 8th.

Radisson 200
The Radisson 200 was held on June 27 at Pikes Peak International Raceway.  Greg Ray qualified on the pole position. The race was broadcast on Fox Sports Net.Top 10 results 2- Greg Ray
 99- Sam Schmidt
 9- Davey Hamilton
 51- Eddie Cheever
 91- Buddy Lazier
 81- Robby Unser
 14- Kenny Bräck
 8- Scott Sharp
 21- Jeff Ward
 33- Jaques Lazier
Ray's first IndyCar win.
Ray led 109 of 200 laps on his way to victory. Schmidt led the other 91 laps.

Kobalt Mechanics Tools 500
The Kobalt Mechanics Tools 500 was held on July 17 at Atlanta Motor Speedway. Billy Boat qualified on the pole position. The race was broadcast on Fox Sports Net.Top 10 results 8- Scott Sharp
 81- Robby Unser
 14- Kenny Bräck
 6- Eliseo Salazar
 12- Buzz Calkins
 51- Eddie Cheever
 9- Davey Hamilton
 98- Donnie Beechler
 30- Jimmy Kite
 11- Billy Boat
Unser's best IndyCar finish.

MBNA Mid-Atlantic 200
The MBNA Mid-Atlantic 200 was held on August 1 at Dover Downs International Speedway. Mark Dismore qualified on the pole position. The race was broadcast on Fox.Top 10 results 2- Greg Ray
 91- Buddy Lazier
 14- Kenny Bräck
 11- Billy Boat
 99- Sam Schmidt
 66- Scott Harrington
 33- Jaques Lazier
 12- Buzz Calkins
 55- Robby McGehee
 98- Donnie Beechler

Colorado Indy 200
The Colorado Indy 200 was held on August 29 at Pikes Peak International Raceway. Greg Ray qualified on the pole position. The race was broadcast on Fox Sports Net.Top 10 results 2- Greg Ray
 9- Davey Hamilton
 28- Mark Dismore
 91- Buddy Lazier
 99- Sam Schmidt
 66- Scott Harrington
 55- Robby McGehee
 30- Jimmy Kite
 81- Robby Unser
 14- Kenny Bräck
This would be the final race aired on Fox. After this race, ESPN/ABC purchased the rights for the remaining two races.

Vegas.com 500
The Vegas.com 500 was held on September 26 at Las Vegas Motor Speedway. Sam Schmidt qualified on the pole position. The race was broadcast on ESPN.Top 10 results 99- Sam Schmidt
 14- Kenny Bräck
 22- Robbie Buhl
 8- Scott Sharp
 12- Buzz Calkins
 55- Robby McGehee
 33- Jaques Lazier
 7- Stephan Gregoire
 20- Tyce Carlson
 21- Jeff Ward
Entering the season-finale, Greg Ray led Bräck by 15 points, Schmidt by 30 points, Sharp by 46 points and Scott Goodyear by 48 points.
Schmidt's only IndyCar win.

Mall.com 500
The Mall.com 500 was held on October 17 at Texas Motor Speedway. Greg Ray qualified on the pole position. The race was broadcast on ABC.Top 10 results' 28- Mark Dismore
 9- Davey Hamilton
 2- Greg Ray
 51- Eddie Cheever
 42- John Hollansworth Jr.
 66- Scott Harrington
 33- Jaques Lazier
 12- Buzz Calkins
 11- Billy Boat
 91- Buddy Lazier
Failed to qualify: 27-Niclas Jönsson and 92-Johnny Unser
Points leader Ray was the only championship eligible driver to finish in the top 5 and top 10, finishing 3rd. Scott Goodyear finished 23rd due to a crash. Scott Sharp finished 19th due to engine failure. Sam Schmidt finished 22nd due to a separate crash. Kenny Bräck finished 16th, 22 laps down.
There were several changes in the top 10 in points following this race due to 3rd being separated from 10th by 31 points. Race winner Dismore moved up from 11th to 3rd, Jeff Ward (at one time the points leader) dropped from 7th to 11th, Sharp dropped from 4th to 8th, Goodyear dropped from 5th to 9th and Hamilton moved up from 7th to 4th.
Dismore's only IndyCar win.
Schmidt's final IndyCar race. His career would end due to a testing crash at Walt Disney World Speedway in January 2000 that left him paralyzed.
Sarah Fisher made her IndyCar debut in this race, becoming the first woman since Lyn St. James at the 1997 Indianapolis 500 to start an IndyCar race. She started 17th, but finished 25th due to a broken timing chain.

 Final points standings 

 1 The 1999 VisionAire 500K at Charlotte was cancelled after 79 laps due to spectator fatalities.''

 Ties in points broken by number of wins, followed by number of 2nds, 3rds, etc., and then by number of pole positions, followed by number of times qualified 2nd, etc.
Additional points were awarded to the pole winner (3 points), the second best qualifier (2 points), the third best qualifier (1 point) and to the driver leading the most laps (2 point).

References

See also 
 1999 Indianapolis 500
 1999 Indy Lights season
 1999 CART season
 1999 Toyota Atlantic Championship season
 http://champcarstats.com/year/1999i.htm
 http://media.indycar.com/pdf/2011/IICS_2011_Historical_Record_Book_INT6.pdf  (p. 135–136)

Indy Racing League
 
IndyCar Series seasons
Indy Racing League